Michael J. Fuchs (pronounced "Fewks") (born New York City, U.S., 9 March 1946) is an American executive producer for premium cable television network HBO.

Career
Fuchs is the son of Charles Fuchs a real estate executive. He was educated at Union College in Schenectady, New York, where he obtained a B.A. in political science in 1967, and a J.D. degree at New York University in 1971.

After gaining experience in entertainment law, Fuchs joined HBO and became active in sports TV production. Fuchs held various senior positions by the early 1980s and was chief executive officer and chairman of the board in 1984.

Then in May 1995 he became vice president of Time Warner and then chairman and CEO of the Warner Music Group. However, due to his extensive changes during his position as chairman which saw the dismissals of several important executives at the company, he was fired by Time Warner chairman Gerald Levin, leaving the company with a reported US$60 million severance package.

Fuchs has produced many concerts for HBO featuring such performers as Bette Midler, Diana Ross, and
Johnny Cash, and he is highly active in C-SPAN (the Cable Satellite Public Affairs Network) and Comedy Central, which is an advertiser-supported network owned by Viacom.

Fuchs is also chairman of the Bryant Park Corporation and is credited for being the inventor of the HBO Bryant Park Summer Movie Festival, one of New York's most popular free summer events.

Awards
CableACE Governor's Award (1993)
CableAce Award Dramatic or Theatrical Special "In the Gloaming" (1997)

References

External links 
 
 
 

1946 births
American Jews
Television producers from New York City
Living people
HBO people
Union College (New York) alumni
New York University School of Law alumni